"I Love Only You" is a song written by Dave Loggins and Don Schlitz, and recorded by American country music group Nitty Gritty Dirt Band. It was released in September 1984 as the second single from the album Plain Dirt Fashion.  The song reached number 3 on the Billboard Hot Country Singles & Tracks chart.

Chart performance

References

1984 singles
Nitty Gritty Dirt Band songs
Songs written by Dave Loggins
Songs written by Don Schlitz
Song recordings produced by Paul Worley
Warner Records singles
1984 songs